{{DISPLAYTITLE:C19H16O3}}
The molecular formula C19H16O3 (molar mass: 292.33 g/mol, exact mass: 292.1099 u) may refer to:

 1,7-Bis(4-hydroxyphenyl)-1,4,6-heptatrien-3-one
 Coumatetralyl